Aroroy, officially the Municipality of Aroroy,  is a 1st class municipality in the province of Masbate, Philippines. According to the 2020 census, it has a population of 88,351 people. The town is known for the Kalanay Cave, one of the most important archaeological sites in Masbate province.

Etymology
The town of Aroroy (Al-Oroy its former name), which came from the Spanish word for gold-"oro", was established back in 1822 upon the arrival of a Chinese expedition. The Chinese fleet was composed of seven vessels called "pancos". They entered Lanang River, which is part of Puerto Barrera, the former name of the area now covered by Aroroy. A Moro named Talcum guided this expedition. They were sent by the Chinese merchants who came to Aroroy to explore for gold coins near Lanang River.

History

During that time, when the present Masbate province was still part of the province of Ibalon (present-day Albay), a captain from the Spanish Army named Gregorio Cordero of Tondo, Manila was exiled in Masbate for the killing of his superior officer. Instead of being incarcerated in the castle of San Pascual in Burias Island, where political and military prisoners were imprisoned by the Captain-General of the Philippine Islands, he was brought to Masbate. Accompanied by his two daughters and a son, they established residency in the Port of Magdalena, municipality of Masbate. He had with him four (4) "Faluas" or Spanish vessels named – Jesus Maria Y Jose, Sacramento, Salvacion and Santa Ana for use in the vigilance against Moro pirates who preyed on the three islands of Masbate, Ticao and Burias. 
 
When the Spaniards discovered the Chinese expedition, Cordero and about one-hundred fifty (150) men, who believed him to possess amulets (anting-anting) which made him invulnerable, sailed to Lanang River to find out the nationality of the said seven (7) vessels which entered Lanang River. When investigated as to where they were going, the aliens answered in their Chinese manner that they were going to "Al-Oroy" meaning to the Gold or in Spanish “Al-oro”. Not satisfied with the results of the investigation with the belief that these are Moro vessels, Cordero and his men established their headquarters for over three (3) months in the presentpoblacion of Aroroy, which was known as Al-Oroy taken from the Chinese reply.

Another expedition of Spaniards from Manila headed by a certain Sarmiento came to explore the gold in the river near Al-oroy in 1861. This expedition was aided by natives of Al-oroy which includes among them were certain Toribio Bunayag, Jose Pusing, Norberto Pusing and Protacio Fabon. Said natives abandoned expedition during the same year because of assaults who are dedicated to pan the riverbeds with bateas and/or limbasan to recover the gold nuggets themselves. This led to the death of Sarmiento and since then said river was called Rio Guinobatan or “River of Assaults”.

Since then the site of Al-Oroy became a "vista" or barrio of the town of Baleno but later was transferred to the town of San Agustin in the interior part of Port Barrera. In 1904, when the towns of Baleno and San Agustin were combined, the name Al-Oroy was changed to Aroroy. It was also in 1904 when Aroroy became a municipality because of its strategic location. San Agustin now is just a barangay of the Municipality of Aroroy.

Geography
Aroroy is geographically located between 12 degrees and 13 degrees Latitude and 123 degrees and 124 degrees Longitude or at the northernmost part of the province of Masbate, Bicol Region. It is bounded on the north by the Masbate Pass, to the East by the municipality of Baleno, to the West by the Sibuyan Sea and to the South by the municipalities of Milagros and Mandaon.

Barangays 
Aroroy is politically subdivided into 41 barangays.

Climate

Demographics

Economy

References

External links 
 [ Philippine Standard Geographic Code]
 Philippine Census Information
 Local Governance Performance Management System

Municipalities of Masbate